The  Company of Maisters of the Science of Defence was an organisation formed in England during the reign of Henry VIII to regulate the teaching of the Arte of Defence or fencing, using a range of weapons, including the rapier, quarterstaff, and, most notably, the broadsword.

This school of fencing persisted throughout the 16th century but declined after the end of the Tudor period.

Tudor England
It served to prevent unlicensed instructors from operating, both as a form of quality assurance and as a monopoly to protect the livelihoods of its members. It also regulated the conduct of members to one another, both instructor and student.

Like the guilds it resembled, the company certified its members with varying ranks, depending on their level of skill and degree of permission to teach. Beginning students took the title Scholar and were required to hold the rank for no less than seven years before progressing to a higher rank following the passing of a test known as Prize Playing. With proper determination and accumulation of skill, an individual moved to the second rank, Free Scholar. This rank marked noted advancement and skill, and like the previous position, had to be held for at least seven years before further progression. The next rank, Provost, provided the individual with apprenticeship to an instructor with whom they worked closely so as to improve their teaching skills and further their martial abilities. The Provost was not by any means a free teacher, remaining under the guidance and financial constraint, in the form of dues, of his superior. A truly gifted individual may have been raised to the title of Maister working as an independent instructor. The Company of Maisters of the Science of Defence was governed by four senior Maisters.

Decline and modern revival
The Company never achieved guild status and eventually lost any influence with the passing of James I's anti-monopoly laws.
A late treatise on the Science of Defence is that by Joseph Swetnam, published in 1617.

There were some attempts in the early 20th century to reform the guild, first in 1903, under the title "The London Académie d’Armes", and again in 1931 as "The British Federation of Fencing Masters".
All this was interrupted by the Second World War.

The modern British Academy of Fencing has claimed to trace its roots back to the Company, and was established in 1949. Today, several Historical European martial arts (HEMA) groups use modified versions of the Company of Masters ranking system. These include The Stoccata School of Defence, The Company B.S.A, Association for Renaissance Martial Arts (ARMA), True Edge Academy of Swordsmanship, the Noble Science Academy, English Fighting Arts, School of English Martial Arts, the 1595 Club, Academie Glorianna, Academie Duello, the York School of Defense, the New Jersey Historical Fencing Association, and the Black Falcon School of Arms.

Literature
Berry, Herbert. The Noble Science: A Study and Transcription of Sloane Ms. 2530, Papers of the Maisters of Defence of London, Temp Henry VIII to 1590. London and Toronto: Associated University Presses, 1991. .

See also

Historical fencing in Scotland

Notes and references 

Historical European martial arts
Historical fencing